Free was Brazilian brand of cigarettes, currently owned and manufactured by Souza Cruz, a subsidiary of British American Tobacco.

History

The brand was launched in 1984 (one of the slogans: "Free-A matter of common sense"). Nowadays, it is one of the most purchased cigarettes in Brazil and, according to the company, leader in the levels below 7 mg of tar.

In 2009, the company reformulated the brand's packaging and launched a line of products on the basis of menthol, the family Mix (Fresh Mix, Citric Mix and Spicy Mix).

Souza Cruz starts in the coming months a trademark migration process ever made for eight years with the now defunct Carlton, which gradually turned into Dunhill. This time, the global brand of Souza Cruz, which will succeed the Free is Kent.

By the end of 2016, Free will also imprint the logo of Kent. Within a year, the name Free will be removed from the pack.

The brand was mainly sold in Brazil, but was also sold in the United States, Mexico and Costa Rica.

See also

 Tobacco smoking

References

External links
 Souzacruz.com.br: Ingredientes do fumo

1984 establishments in Brazil
2016 disestablishments in Brazil
British American Tobacco brands